Brotmanville is an unincorporated community located within Pittsgrove Township, in Salem County, New Jersey, United States. The area is accessible via exit 35 on Route 55. The community of Brotmanville was originally a Jewish settlement and is currently a predominantly African-American neighborhood.

Notable people

People who were born in, residents of, or otherwise closely associated with Brotmanville include:
 Stanley Brotman (1924–2014), Judge of the United States District Court for the District of New Jersey.

References

Pittsgrove Township, New Jersey
Unincorporated communities in Salem County, New Jersey
Unincorporated communities in New Jersey